Newton was a parliamentary borough in the county of Lancashire, in England.  It was represented by two Members of Parliament in the House of Commons of the Parliament of England from 1559 to 1706 then of the Parliament of Great Britain from 1707 to 1800 and of the Parliament of the United Kingdom from 1801 until its abolition in 1832.

In 1885 a county constituency with the same name was created and represented by one Member of Parliament. This seat was abolished in 1983.

Parliamentary borough
The borough consisted of the parish of Newton-le-Willows in the Makerfield district of South Lancashire. It was first enfranchised in 1558 (though the Parliament so summoned did not meet until the following year), and was a rotten borough from its inception: Newton was barely more than a village even at this stage, and so entirely dominated by the local landowner that its first return of members described it bluntly as "the borough of Sir Thomas Langton, knight, baron of Newton within his Fee of Markerfylde". By 1831, just before its abolition, the population of the borough had reached only 2,139, and contained 285 houses.

The right to vote was exercised by all freeholders of property in the borough valued at forty shillings or more, or by one representative of joint tenants of any such freeholds; Newton was the only borough where the forty-shilling freehold franchise (which applied in the counties) was the sole qualification to vote. In 1797, the borough's last contested election, 76 electors cast their votes; by 1831 it was estimated that the electorate had fallen to about 52. (As elsewhere, each elector had as many votes as there were seats to be filled and votes had to be cast by a spoken declaration, in public, at the hustings.)

In practice, however, the townsmen of Newton had no say in choosing their representatives: as the owners of the majority of the qualifying freeholds, the lords of the manor exercised total control. During most of the Elizabethan period, Langton seems to have allowed the Duchy of Lancaster to nominate many of the members, which may have been a quid pro quo for Newton's being enfranchised in the first place, but later patrons could regard its parliamentary seats as their personal property. Langton's heir sold the manor to the Fleetwood family in 1594, the sale explicitly including the right of "the nomination, election and appointment" of the two burgesses representing the borough in Parliament, one of the earliest recorded instances of the right to elect MPs being bought and sold. By the first half of the next century it had passed to the Leghs, who owned it for the rest of its existence.

By the time of the Great Reform Act of 1832, Newton was one of the most notorious of all England's pocket boroughs, mainly because the Legh control was more complete than that of the patrons in most other constituencies. It was one of the 56 boroughs to be totally disenfranchised by the Reform Act.

County constituency
The Redistribution of Seats Act 1885 created a new Newton constituency, as one of twenty-three divisions of the parliamentary county of Lancashire.

Boundaries 1885 - 1918
The constituency, officially designated as South-West Lancashire, Newton Division consisted of a number of townships and parishes around Newton le Willows namely:
 Ashton in Makerfield
 Billinge Chapel End
 Billinge Higher End
 Part of Eccleston
 Rainhill
 Winstanley

The electorate also included the freeholders of the municipal boroughs of St Helens and Warrington who were entitled to vote in the county.

Boundaries 1918 - 1950

The Representation of the People Act 1918 reorganised constituencies throughout the United Kingdom. Boundaries were adjusted and seats were defined in terms of the districts created by the Local Government Act 1894. According to the schedules of the Act, the Lancashire, Newton Division comprised:
 Golborne Urban District
 Haydock Urban District
 Newton in Makerfield Urban District
 Leigh Rural District (except the civil parish of Astley)
 Warrington Rural District

Boundaries 1950 - 1983

The Representation of the People Act 1948 redistributed parliamentary seats, with the constituencies first being used in the general election of 1950. The term "county constituency" was introduced in place of "division". Newton County Constituency was redefined as consisting of the following districts:
 Golborne Urban District
 Haydock Urban District
 Irlam Urban District
 Newton-le-Willows Urban District
 Warrington Rural District

The changes reflected the fact that Leigh Rural District had been abolished in 1933, Newton in Makerfield Urban district had been renamed Newton le Willows in 1939. Irlam was transferred from the neighbouring Stretford constituency.

The boundaries were unchanged at the next redistribution of seats in 1970. Although local government was reorganised in 1972, boundaries were unchanged until 1983.

Abolition
The constituency was abolished by the Parliamentary Constituencies (England) Order 1983, which reorganised seats on the lines of the 1974 counties and districts, by which time the Newton constituency had become vastly oversized with an electorate of over 80,000 in 1979. The bulk of the seat formed part of the new Makerfield County Constituency. Irlam was included in the Worsley County Constituency, while part of Golborne became part of both Leigh Borough Constituency and Warrington North Borough Constituency.  The town of Newton itself, as well as Haydock, were incorporated into the St Helens North Borough Constituency.

Members of Parliament

MPs 1559–1660

MPs 1660–1832

MPs 1885–1983

Elections

Elections in the 1880s

Cross was appointed Secretary of State for India and was elevated to the peerage, becoming Viscount Cross, causing a by-election.

Elections in the 1890s

Legh is elevated to the peerage, becoming Lord Newton.

Elections in the 1900s

Elections in the 1910s

Elections in the 1920s

Elections in the 1930s

Elections in the 1940s

Elections in the 1950s

Elections in the 1960s

Elections in the 1970s

See also

 List of former United Kingdom Parliament constituencies
 Unreformed House of Commons

References

Sources
 
 J E Neale, The Elizabethan House of Commons (London: Jonathan Cape, 1949)
 J Holladay Philbin, Parliamentary Representation 1832 - England and Wales (New Haven: Yale University Press, 1965)
 Edward Porritt and Annie G Porritt, The Unreformed House of Commons (Cambridge University Press, 1903)
 Frederic A Youngs, Jr, Guide to the Local Administrative Units of England, Vol II (London: Royal Historical Society, 1991)

External links
 

Parliamentary constituencies in North West England (historic)
Constituencies of the Parliament of the United Kingdom established in 1559
Constituencies of the Parliament of the United Kingdom disestablished in 1832
Constituencies of the Parliament of the United Kingdom established in 1885
Constituencies of the Parliament of the United Kingdom disestablished in 1983
Rotten boroughs
Newton-le-Willows